Le Tabor is a mountain in the Isère department of France.

References

Mountains of Isère
Mountains of the Alps
Auvergne-Rhône-Alpes region articles needing translation from French Wikipedia